After the death of co-host Dirk Bach the future of the show was unknown. In October 2012 RTL revealed Daniel Hartwich as new host. Sonja Zietlow remains as host for the show.

In this series there is another show called Ich bin ein Star - Holt mich hier raus! Das Magazin, which picks up the latest action in camp in talk with former campmates. It is aired from Monday to Friday at 7:50 pm (CET).

The series starts on January, 11. For the first time a replacement for one of the participants was sent into the camp two days after the show had already started. Klaus Baumgart replaced Helmut Berger as Berger had to leave the camp because of medical issues..

Also for the first time in history, a group of six celebrities were sent into the jungle, one day before the other five celebrities were sent into the camp. New is a tree house near the camp. Two celebrities can sleep in it, but only by instruction.

Contestants

Bushtucker Trials

Total number of Bushtucker Trials done by each participant:

References 

2013 German television seasons
07